Hiekkaharju railway station is a Helsinki commuter rail station located in the district of Hiekkaharju in the city of Vantaa, Finland.

The Hiekkaharju station has acted as an in-between stop during the construction of the Kerava local railway track. The third track of the main railway was taken into use in 1972 between Helsinki and Hiekkaharju and was continued to Kerava in 1981. Likewise, the fourth track was completed in 1996 between Helsinki and Hiekkaharju and only continued to Kerava in 2004. When the local railway track was completed in 2004, the Hiekkaharju station was thoroughly renovated. Also the P train, running between Helsinki and Hiekkaharju, was discontinued and replaced with the I train, which only runs between Helsinki and Tikkurila.

Connections
 I/P trains (Helsinki - Helsinki Airport - Helsinki)
 K trains (Helsinki - Kerava)
 T trains (Helsinki - Riihimäki), nighttime

References 

Railway stations in Vantaa